The Battle of Korytsa was fought during the Greco-Italian War of 1940–41 in the town of Korçë (Greek: Korytsa) in southern Albania between the defending Italian 9th Army and the attacking Greek III Army Corps.

After the initial Italian invasion starting 28 October had been stopped, Greek forces launched a counter-offensive in early November. The battle for Korytsa formed the first part of the operation against the Italians and marked the final stage of the Greek penetration in the Battle of Morava–Ivan heights sector.

The Italian 9th Army was entrenched around the town, but fierce fighting over two days led to the break-through of the Italian defensive line by the Greeks and its capture. Remnants of the 9th Army itself avoided capture, as the opposing Greek forces were poorly motorized and unable to pursue the retreating Italians.

References

External links
 Greek army article on the battle

Korytsa
Korytsa
Korce
Korce
History of Korçë County
1940 in Albania
November 1940 events